Results from Norwegian football in 1951.

Hovedserien 1950/51

Group A

Group B

Championship final
June 21: Odd - Fredrikstad 1-3

June 26: Fredrikstad - Odd 4-2 (agg. 7-3)

First Division 1950/51
After the 1950/51 season, Landsdelsserien was introduced, leaving the First division as only the third highest league.

District I

District II, Group A

District II, Group B

District III

District IV, Group A

District IV, Group B

District V, Group A

District V, Group B

District VI

District VII

District VIII

Play-off Preliminary Round
Geithus - Asker 0-2

Larvik Turn - Snøgg 1-1

Ålgård - Flekkefjord 1-0

Asker - Geithus 3-0 (agg. 5-0)

Snøgg - Larvik Turn 2-1 (agg. 3-2)

Flekkefjord - Ålgård 0-0 (agg. 0-1)

Play-off Group A
Årstad - Snøgg 1-1

Ålgård - Gjøvik/Lyn 0-0

Årstad - Ålgård 1-0

Snøgg - Gjøvik/Lyn 4-0

Gjøvik/Lyn - Årstad 1-1

Snøgg - Ålgård 3-2

Play-off Group B
Kvik (Halden) - Kvik (Trondheim) 2-2

Aalesund - Asker 3-6

Asker - Kvik (Trondheim) 2-2

Kvik (Halden) - Aalesund 0-2

Asker - Kvik (Halden) 3-0

Kvik (Trondheim) - Aalesund 3-0

Promoted to First Division
Donn, Jarl, Langevåg, Neset, Nymark, Ulf and Wing.

Norwegian Cup

Final

Northern Norwegian Cup

Final

National team

References

  
Seasons in Norwegian football